Michael "Mike" Shayne is a fictional private detective character created during the late 1930s by writer Brett Halliday, a pseudonym of Davis Dresser. The character appeared in a series of seven films starring Lloyd Nolan for Twentieth Century Fox, five films from the low-budget Producers Releasing Corporation with Hugh Beaumont, a radio series under a variety of titles between 1944 and 1953, and later in 1960–1961 in a 32-episode NBC television series starring Richard Denning in the title role.

Character biography

Shayne debuted in the novel Dividend on Death first published in 1939, written by Dresser as Halliday. Fifty Shayne novels were published in hardcover written by Dresser (until 1958) and a variety of ghost-writers. Twenty-seven more were published as paperback originals for a total of seventy-seven. There are also 300 short stories (although many of these are condensed from, or were expanded into, published novels), a dozen films, radio programs and television shows, and a few comic book appearances that included the character.

Shayne was initially married in the novels, his wife being Phyllis (Brighton) Shayne, who was a somewhat limited character, and was often out of town. Dresser "killed her off" when he sold the movie rights to the series. In the book Blood on the Black Market, the comedy aspect of the earlier novels disappears and Shayne is forced to deal with his wife's death. Other recurring characters in the stories are reporter Tim Rourke, Police Lt. Will Gentry, and Shayne's secretary Lucy Hamilton.

Magazine
Dresser later created Mike Shayne Mystery Magazine, first introduced in 1956 by Renown Publications under the title Michael Shayne Mystery Magazine. The magazine continued for nearly three decades, always including at least one Shayne novella in each edition. By this time, "Brett Halliday" was simply a house name. For several years the magazine was edited by Frank Belknap Long.

Films
The 1940 film Michael Shayne, Private Detective is the first in a series of twelve movies. Lloyd Nolan starred as Shayne through 1942, until the series was dropped by Twentieth Century Fox and picked up by PRC.

At that point, Hugh Beaumont took over the role in five films released in 1946. Then, over a half-century later, in 2005, Shane Black directed Kiss Kiss Bang Bang, starring Robert Downey Jr. and Val Kilmer. It was based, in part, on the Shayne novel Bodies Are Where You Find Them, but does not feature Shayne as a character.

Twentieth Century Fox films with Lloyd Nolan
 Michael Shayne, Private Detective (1940; based on Halliday's novel The Private Practice of Michael Shayne)
 Sleepers West (1941; based on the novel Sleepers East by Frederick Nebel)
 Dressed to Kill (1941; based on the novel The Dead Take No Bows by Richard Burke)
 Blue, White and Perfect (1942; plot from the serial story Blue, White, and Perfect by Borden Chase)
 The Man Who Wouldn't Die (1942; based on the novel No Coffin for the Corpse by Clayton Rawson)
 Just Off Broadway (1942; original screenplay)
 Time to Kill (1942; based on the novel The High Window by Raymond Chandler)

PRC films with Hugh Beaumont
 Murder Is My Business (1946)
 Larceny in Her Heart (1946)
 Blonde for a Day (1946)
 Three on a Ticket (1947)
 Too Many Winners (1947)

Radio
Jeff Chandler and Wally Maher were among the actors who starred as Shayne in three weekly radio series.

Television

In 1958, a failed 30-minute pilot titled "Three Men on a Raft" with Mark Stevens playing Michael Shayne and Merry Anders as Lucy Hamilton was aired on the NBC anthology series "Decision". Then, in 1960, the 32-episode Michael Shayne television series began on NBC, with Richard Denning, formerly of the series Mr. and Mrs. North, in the title role. Patricia Donahue originated the role of Lucy Hamilton, Shayne's secretary, but was later replaced by Margie Regan as Lucy Carr after more than half of the episodes had been filmed. Herbert Rudley played Lieutenant Will Gentry of the Miami Police Department, and Jerry Paris played reporter Tim Rourke of the fictitious Miami Tribune. Gary Clarke, later of The Virginian, played Dick Hamilton, Lucy's younger brother, a character who does not appear in Halliday's books.

William Link and Richard Levinson wrote a number of episodes of the series, including "This Is It, Michael Shayne", which was based on Halliday's novel of that name. Julie Adams, who had previously worked with Richard Denning in Creature from the Black Lagoon, guest starred in this episode. Richard Arlen guest starred as Vincent Rinker in the 1961 episode, "Murder Is a Fine Art."

Beverly Garland appeared in "Murder and the Wanton Bride." She and Denning had previously starred in the 1957 Roger Corman feature film, Naked Paradise. Garland and Denning later costarred with Vincent Price in "The House of the Seven Gables" segment of the film Twice-Told Tales (1963). Warren Oates, Joan Marshall, and David White guest starred in the episode "Murder Round My Wrist." Margie Regan played a nurse in this episode, while Patricia Donahue was still playing Lucy Hamilton. On December 2, 1960, Robert Knapp portrayed Arthur Hudson in the episode "Blood on Biscayne Bay".

The hour-long series ran at 10 p.m. Fridays, opposite CBS's The Twilight Zone with Rod Serling and ABC's The Detectives with Robert Taylor and The Law and Mr. Jones, starring James Whitmore, Conlan Carter, and Janet De Gore.

Episodes

* Unknown

Comics
Dell Comics picked up the character for a comic book series (three issues), Mike Shayne – Private Eye.

References

External links

 
 Michael Shayne at ThrillingDetective.com
 DVD starring Lloyd Nolan
 The Toughest Red Head Ever Brett Halliday explains the creation of Mike Shayne

Michael Shayne
Michael Shayne
Michael Shayne
Characters in detective novel series
Episode lists with row deviations
Fictional private investigators
Literary characters introduced in 1939
Michael Shayne